Justice and Peace may refer to the ideal of peace based on justice, or to institutions working towards this ideal such as:

Justice and Peace Alliance (Kuwait)
Movement for Justice and Peace
Pontifical Council for Justice and Peace
National Commission for Justice and Peace in Pakistan
Catholic Commission for Justice and Peace in Zimbabwe
Canadians for Justice and Peace in the Middle East

See also
Justice for Peace and Development
Peace and Justice Congress
United for Peace and Justice
Members group of Peace and Justice